Leuctrum or Leuktron, was a deme (dependent township) of Rhypes, a city in Achaea, mentioned by the ancient geographer Strabo. One suggested location for it is the fortified hill of Agios Konstantinos southwest of modern Leontio, Achaia.

References

Populated places in ancient Achaea
Former populated places in Greece
Lost ancient cities and towns